The Biskopåsen Formation is a geologic formation in Innlandet. Norway. It preserves microfossils of Neoproterozoic age.

See also

 List of fossiliferous stratigraphic units in Norway

References

 

Geologic formations of Norway
Conglomerate formations